The Ministry of the Interior and Security is a ministry of the Democratic Republic of the Congo.

The Direction Générale de Migration (DGM "Direction General of Migration") has its head office in Gombe, Kinshasa.

References

External links

 Direction Générale de Migration 
 Comité de Suivi de la Réforme de la Police (CSRP "Police Reform Follow-up Committee") 

Interior
Democratic Republic of the Congo